David Steven Call (born August 14, 1982) is an American actor.

Personal life
Call was born in Issaquah, Washington. He is a graduate student of the Tisch School of the Arts and the Atlantic Theater Company Acting School.

Acting career
Call's first acting role was an uncredited role in the 2005 film The Notorious Bettie Page, followed by roles in the 2006 films The Architect and Beautiful Ohio. In 2007, he appeared in the romantic drama film Evening. He guest-starred in the television series Law & Order: Criminal Intent as Ricky Moss in the episode Neighborhood Watch, and he appeared on Army Wives. In 2009, he appeared in five episodes of the drama series Rescue Me as the adult Connor Gavin. He also joined the cast of NBC's medical drama Mercy. He got a supporting role in the 2009 film Did You Hear About the Morgans? starring Sarah Jessica Parker and Hugh Grant. He appeared in the 2010 independent films Tiny Furniture and Two Gates of Sleep.

In July 2010, Call joined the cast of The CW's young-adult teen drama series Gossip Girl as Ben Donovan, who is connected to two other then-new characters—Juliet Sharp (Katie Cassidy) and Colin Forrester (Samuel Page).

Call portrayed the recurring role of Nick Lane, on the Fox science-fiction series Fringe. The character made his first appearance in the first season episode "Bad Dreams", which was critically lauded.

In 2013, he appeared on the NBC drama series Smash as Adam, Jimmy Collins's older brother, and on the USA Network series White Collar.

Filmography

Film

Television
2021 The Equalizer 
Elias Wilson

References

External links
 
 April 2007 article at Issaquah School District

1982 births
21st-century American male actors
American male film actors
American male television actors
Living people
Male actors from Washington (state)
People from Issaquah, Washington
Tisch School of the Arts alumni